Hyndburn is a constituency represented in the House of Commons of the UK Parliament since 2019 by Sara Britcliffe of the Conservative Party.

History and profile
The seat was created in 1983, from parts of the former seats of Accrington and Clitheroe. In its ambit is much terraced (freehold) owner occupied housing and surrounding villages, that may have helped to win the constituency for a Conservative in 1983, by 21 votes. The Conservative majority in 1983 was the second smallest achieved by any party in a seat in the United Kingdom at that election, only being beaten by the Conservatives 7 vote majority in Leicester South  In 1987, against the national trend, the Conservative vote share increased by 2.1% while Labour's vote share fell by 2.4%. Consequently, the Conservatives increased their majority to 2,220 votes,  a higher majority than it achieved in 31 other seats.

Labour won it in 1992, and chose a new candidate for 2010, Graham Jones, who was elected. Part of Labour's Red Wall, the seat was won by the Conservatives in 2019, with the twenty-four year old Tory candidate Sara Britcliffe ousting Jones with a swing of 9.9%.

In January 1996, Hyndburn Conservatives deselected Hugh Neil, after a six-week investigation into alleged bogus claims that he made about his background. Neil claimed to have a doctorate from Manchester Business School and Harvard Business School, to have been an adviser to Keith Joseph, and to be a member of the Institute of Directors. He would have been the party's first black MP.

Boundaries

1983-1997: The Borough of Hyndburn.

1997–present: The Borough of Hyndburn, and the Borough of Rossendale wards of Greenfield and Worsley.

A mostly Labour inclined seat, based around the East Lancashire town of Accrington, it also includes Clayton-le-Moors, Great Harwood, Oswaldtwistle, and Rishton in Hyndburn, and Haslingden in Rossendale.

Following its review of parliamentary representation in Lancashire in the 2000s, the Boundary Commission made minor alterations to the existing Hyndburn constituency. Two Haslingden wards from Rossendale district had been added to the constituency in 1997. The Commission rejected a proposal to rename the constituency "Hyndburn and Haslingden", following the Assistant Commissioner's view that;

It is obviously right that constituency names should as far as possible reflect the geography and character of the constituency but equally they should be as succinct as reasonably possible

Members of Parliament

Elections

Elections in the 2010s

Elections in the 2000s

Elections in the 1990s

Elections in the 1980s

See also
List of parliamentary constituencies in Lancashire

Notes

References

Parliamentary constituencies in North West England
Constituencies of the Parliament of the United Kingdom established in 1983
Politics of Hyndburn